McKeown and MacKeown are Irish surnames originating both from the Irish Mac Eoghain ("Son of Eoghan") and Mac Eoin ("Son of Eoin"), which are pronounced identically: /mək ˈow ən/ or "McOwen".
The surnames are associated with the Mac Eoin Bissett family. A family who arrived in the Irish Glens of Antrim in the 13th century AD with John Bissett. The family settled in the region with other Anglo-Norman families, marrying into local Gaelic families, adopting the Gaelic culture, laws, language and finding themselves totally assimilated into Irish life.

It has been suggested that within Northern Ireland's borders there are McKeowns that have a totally separate historical lineage, immigrating to Ireland with Ulster-Scotch planters, settling there during the great plantations.

This claim is difficult to substantiate, due to poor church or state records during the plantation period.

However, the lack of frequency of the name  "McKeown" (and its variants) within earlier Scottish census records does not appear to suggest any evidence of a separate Scottish planter family.

There are at least three common ways to pronounce the name. The name is commonly pronounced "Mick-Yone" within Ireland itself, however across the globe a whole range of slightly different pronunciations can now be found.

 /mɪk ˈjoʊn/ "Mick Yone"
 /mə ˈkjuən/ "Mick You-En"
 /mə ˈkiən/  "Mick Key-En"

People 
Bob McKeown, Canadian reporter
Charles McKeown, British actor and writer
Ciaran McKeown (1943–2019), Northern Ireland peace activist
Bishop Donal McKeown Catholic Auxiliary Bishop of Down and Connor
Erin McKeown, American singer
Gary McKeown, British footballer (retired)
Greg McKeown (author), leadership consultant and writer
Greg McKeown, American soccer player (retired)
James McKeown, Irish football player
Jim McKeown (soccer), American soccer player
Jim McKeown (racing driver), Australian racing driver
Jimeoin McKeown, Irish-Australian comedian and actor
John McKeown, Scottish singer
Joseph McKeown, British photographer
Kaylee McKeown, Australian swimmer
Laurence McKeown, Provisional Irish Republican Army member
Les McKeown (1955–2021), Scottish singer, former member of the Bay City Rollers
M. Margaret McKeown, judge on the United States Court of Appeals for the Ninth Circuit
Max McKeown, British management author
Nick McKeown, Professor of electrical engineering and computer science at Stanford University
Paul McKeown, Scottish intelligence and analytics expert
Sean McKeown, American Herpetologist
Susan McKeown, Irish-American singer
Taylor McKeown, Australian swimmer
Thomas McKeown, British physician and historian
Thomas McKeown, Scottish footballer (Celtic, Blackburn Rovers, Scotland)
Tom D. McKeown, American politician (US Representative from Oklahoma)

See also
McCune (surname)
McCunn
MacEwen

English-language surnames
Scottish surnames
Surnames of Irish origin
Anglicised Irish-language surnames
Patronymic surnames
Surnames from given names